Robinvale may refer to:

Robinvale, Australia
Robinvale, New Jersey, United States